Flemingia is a genus of plants in the legume family Fabaceae. It is native to Asia and the species are distributed in Bhutan, Burma, China, India; Indonesia, Laos, Malaysia, Nepal, Pakistan, Papua New Guinea, Philippines, Sri Lanka, Taiwan, Thailand and Vietnam. The genus was erected in 1812.

Diversity
The number of known species is ambiguous due to taxonomic problems; and is usually enumerated as more than 30. Burma and China have the highest record of Flemingia species with 16 each, followed by India (with 15 species), Thailand (11 species), Laos (10 species), Vietnam (8 species), Bhutan (1 species) and Nepal (5 species).

Traditional use
Some species of Flemingia are used in the herbal medicine traditions of various Asian communities. This is attributed to their unique chemical properties, especially those of flavonoids and sterols. Their most common applications in traditional medicine are for epilepsy, dysentery, stomach ache, insomnia, cataract, helminthiasis, rheumatism, ulcer, and tuberculosis.

Description
Members of Flemingia are shrubs, or herbs (or subshrubs); evergreen, or deciduous and perennial. They are generally about 0.2–1.5 m high. The stem is prostrate but weak. Leaves are small to medium-sized; not fasciculate, but alternate. The stem and leaves are pubescent, with dense hairs. Leaf blades are flat dorsoventrally. Flowers are aggregated in ‘inflorescences’; not crowded at the stem bases; in racemes, or in heads, or in panicles. Fruits are aerial, about 6–15 mm long; non-fleshy and hairy.

Uses
Root tubers of Flamingia species have traditionally been used as food for Aborigines of the Northern Territory.

Species
Some important species include:

Flemingia bhutanica
Flemingia brevipes
Flemingia chappar
Flemingia fruticulosa
Flemingia rhodocarpa
Flemingia grandiflora
Flemingia lineata
Flemingia macrophylla
Flemingia philippinensis
Flemingia prostrata
Flemingia semialata
Flemingia stricta
Flemingia strobilifera
Flemingia vestita

References

External links
Classification at Botanica Sistematica
Plant Profile at USDA Plant Database
ITIS Report
Taxonomy at UniProt
Classification at Encyclopedia of Life

NCBI Taxonomy Browser
Plantillustrations

Phaseoleae
Medicinal plants
Fabaceae genera